Pirimi Pererika Tahiwi (16 September 1890 – 30 July 1969) was a notable New Zealand  schoolteacher, rugby player, soldier, musician, and community leader. Of Māori descent, he identified with the Ngati Raukawa, Ngati Whakaue and Te Arawa iwi. He was born in Ōtaki, Manawatu/Horowhenua, New Zealand in 1890. Kingi Te Ahoaho Tahiwi was an elder brother.

References

1890 births
1969 deaths
New Zealand military personnel
New Zealand Māori soldiers
New Zealand Māori schoolteachers
Ngāti Raukawa people
Ngāti Whakaue people
Te Arawa people
People from Ōtaki, New Zealand